The Fire Hall No. 1 in Nashville, Tennessee, at 1312 3rd Ave. N., was built in 1936.  It was listed on the National Register of Historic Places in 2008.

It is a -story fire station which was designed to appear residential, with elements of Tudor Revival style.

It has also been known as the "Germantown Fire Hall and as the George W. Swint Sr. Engine Company No. 1.

In 2008, it was owned by Neighborhoods Resource Center, which planned to convert it into offices.

It is located just outside the boundary of the Germantown Historic District, which is also listed on the National Register.

References

Fire stations on the National Register of Historic Places in Tennessee
National Register of Historic Places in Davidson County, Tennessee
Tudor Revival architecture in the United States
Buildings and structures completed in 1936